Guillermo Rafael de Amores Ravelo (born 19 October 1994) is a Uruguayan professional footballer who plays as a goalkeeper for Spanish Segunda División side Sporting de Gijón, on loan from Argentine Primera División club Lanús.

Club career
De Amores is a youth academy graduate of Liverpool Montevideo. He made his professional debut on 4 December 2011 in a 1–0 league defeat against Nacional.

De Amores joined Brazilian club Fluminense in 2018, on loan from Boston River. In 2020, he returned to his home country with Fénix, before moving to Deportivo Cali in the following year.

On 19 July 2022, de Amores joined Argentine Primera División club Lanús on a contract until December 2026. The following 27 January, he was loaned to Spanish Segunda División side Sporting de Gijón until the end of the season.

International career
De Amores is a former Uruguayan youth international. He was part of Uruguayan squads which finished as runners-up at 2011 FIFA U-17 World Cup and 2013 FIFA U-20 World Cup. He was selected as the best goalkeeper in the latter tournament. In July 2015, he won gold medal with Uruguay's under-22 team at 2015 Pan American Games.

On 21 October 2022, de Amores was named in Uruguay's 55-man preliminary squad for the 2022 FIFA World Cup.

Honours

International
Uruguay U-17
FIFA U-17 World Cup: Runner-Up 2011

Uruguay U-20
FIFA U-20 World Cup: Runner-Up 2013

Uruguay U-23
Pan American Games: 2015

Individual
FIFA U-20 World Cup Golden Glove: 2013

References

External links
 

1994 births
Living people
People from Canelones Department
Association football goalkeepers
Uruguayan footballers
Uruguay under-20 international footballers
Uruguay youth international footballers
Uruguayan Primera División players
Uruguayan Segunda División players
Categoría Primera A players
Argentine Primera División players
Liverpool F.C. (Montevideo) players
Boston River players
Fluminense FC players
Club Atlético Fénix players
Deportivo Cali footballers
Club Atlético Lanús footballers
Sporting de Gijón players
Pan American Games gold medalists for Uruguay
Footballers at the 2015 Pan American Games
Pan American Games medalists in football
Medalists at the 2015 Pan American Games
Uruguayan expatriate footballers
Uruguayan expatriate sportspeople in Brazil
Uruguayan expatriate sportspeople in Colombia
Uruguayan expatriate sportspeople in Argentina
Uruguayan expatriate sportspeople in Spain
Expatriate footballers in Brazil
Expatriate footballers in Colombia
Expatriate footballers in Argentina
Expatriate footballers in Spain